Hanumakonda mandal is one of the 14 mandals in  Hanumakonda district of the Indian state of Telangana. It has thousand pillar temple and public garden.

so many institutes , coaching centers and hospitals are in hanumakonda.

Villages/Areas
Kumarpally
Hanumakonda 
Palivelpula
Lashkar Singaram
Gopalpur
Waddepally

References 

Mandals in Hanamkonda district